Nuthe-Urstromtal is a municipality in the Teltow-Fläming district of Brandenburg, Germany. By area, it is the largest rural municipality ("Gemeinde") in Germany.

Demography

People 
 Rudi Dutschke (1940 in Schönefeld -1979), German  Marxist sociologist and a political activist

References

Localities in Teltow-Fläming
Fläming Heath